The 1997–98 QMJHL season was the 29th season in the history of the Quebec Major Junior Hockey League. The Quebec Remparts name was revived after twelve years when the Beauport Harfangs changed identities. The QMJHL continued to grow in eastern markets, with an expansion team in Baie-Comeau and the relocating of the Granby Prédateurs to Cape Breton.

The league inaugurated the Philips Plaque, awarded to the player with the best faceoff percentage. The Ford Cups were renamed the Telus Cups, one each for the offensive and defensive players of the year.

Fifteen teams played 70 games each in the schedule. The Quebec Remparts finished first overall in the regular season winning their first Jean Rougeau Trophy, since the original name was revived. The Val-d'Or Foreurs won their first President's Cup, defeating the Rimouski Océanic in the finals.

Team changes
 The Baie-Comeau Drakkar joined the league as an expansion franchise.
 The Beauport Harfangs relocated from the nearby suburbs, to Quebec City, becoming the second incarnation of the Quebec Remparts.
 The Granby Prédateurs relocated to Sydney, Nova Scotia, becoming the Cape Breton Screaming Eagles, and switched to the Dilio Division.
 The Shawinigan Cataractes switched to the Lebel Division.
 The Victoriaville Tigres switched to the Lebel Division.

Final standings
Note: GP = Games played; W = Wins; L = Losses; T = Ties; Pts = Points; GF = Goals for; GA = Goals against

complete list of standings.

Scoring leaders
Note: GP = Games played; G = Goals; A = Assists; Pts = Points; PIM = Penalty minutes

 complete scoring statistics

Playoffs
Jean-Pierre Dumont was the leading scorer of the playoffs with 46 points (31 goals, 15 assists).

Division quarterfinals
 Quebec Remparts defeated Cape Breton Screaming Eagles 4 games to 0.
 Rimouski Océanic defeated Halifax Mooseheads 4 games to 1.
 Moncton Wildcats defeated Chicoutimi Saguenéens 4 games to 2.
 Hull Olympiques defeated Rouyn-Noranda Huskies 4 games to 2.
 Laval Titan Collège Français defeated Victoriaville Tigres 4 games to 2.
 Val-d'Or Foreurs defeated Shawinigan Cataractes 4 games to 2.

Division semifinals - Round-robin
Note: GP = Games played; W = Wins; L = Losses; T = Ties; PTS = Points; GF = Goals for; GA = Goals against

‡ Laval Titan Collège Français defeated Hull Olympiques in a one-game playoff to determine 2nd place in the round-robin standings.

Division finals
 Rimouski Océanic defeated Quebec Remparts 4 games to 2.
 Val-d'Or Foreurs defeated Laval Titan Collège Français 4 games to 1.

League finals
 Val-d'Or Foreurs defeated Rimouski Océanic 4 games to 0.

All-star teams
First team
 Goaltender - Mathieu Garon, Victoriaville Tigres
 Left defence - Derrick Walser, Rimouski Océanic
 Right defence - Remi Royer, Rouyn-Noranda Huskies
 Left winger - Ramzi Abid, Chicoutimi Saguenéens
 Centreman - Vincent Lecavalier, Rimouski Océanic
 Right winger - Mathieu Benoit, Chicoutimi Saguenéens
 Coach - Guy Chouinard, Quebec Remparts

Second team
 Goaltender - Patrick Couture, Quebec Remparts
 Left defence - Alexei Tezikov, Moncton Wildcats
 Right defence - Jonathan Girard, Laval Titan Collège Français
 Left winger - Pierre Dagenais, Rouyn-Noranda Huskies
 Centreman - Mike Ribeiro, Rouyn-Noranda Huskies
 Right winger - Sebastien Roger, Moncton Wildcats
 Coach - Claude Julien, Hull Olympiques

Rookie team
 Goaltender - Jean-Marc Pelletier, Rimouski Océanic
 Left defence - Alexei Tezikov, Moncton Wildcats
 Right defence - Mathieu Biron, Shawinigan Cataractes
 Left winger - Brad Richards, Rimouski Océanic
 Centreman - Mike Ribeiro, Rouyn-Noranda Huskies
 Right winger - Michael Ryder, Hull Olympiques
 Coach - Christian Larue, Chicoutimi Saguenéens
 List of First/Second/Rookie team all-stars.

Trophies and awards
Team
President's Cup - Playoff Champions, Val-d'Or Foreurs
Jean Rougeau Trophy - Regular Season Champions, Quebec Remparts
Robert Lebel Trophy - Team with best GAA, Quebec Remparts

Player
Michel Brière Memorial Trophy - Most Valuable Player, Ramzi Abid, Chicoutimi Saguenéens
Jean Béliveau Trophy - Top Scorer, Ramzi Abid, Chicoutimi Saguenéens
Guy Lafleur Trophy - Playoff MVP, Jean-Pierre Dumont, Val-d'Or Foreurs
Telus Cup – Offensive - Offensive Player of the Year, Pierre Dagenais, Rouyn-Noranda Huskies
Telus Cup – Defensive - Defensive Player of the Year, Mathieu Garon, Victoriaville Tigres
AutoPro Plaque - Best plus/minus total, David Thibeault, Victoriaville Tigres
Philips Plaque - Best faceoff percentage, Eric Demers, Victoriaville Tigres
Jacques Plante Memorial Trophy - Best GAA, Mathieu Garon, Victoriaville Tigres
Emile Bouchard Trophy - Defenceman of the Year, Derrick Walser, Rimouski Océanic
Mike Bossy Trophy - Best Pro Prospect, Vincent Lecavalier, Rimouski Océanic
RDS Cup - Rookie of the Year, Mike Ribeiro, Rouyn-Noranda Huskies
Michel Bergeron Trophy - Offensive Rookie of the Year, Mike Ribeiro, Rouyn-Noranda Huskies
Raymond Lagacé Trophy - Defensive Rookie of the Year, Alexei Tezikov, Moncton Wildcats
Frank J. Selke Memorial Trophy - Most sportsmanlike player, Simon Laliberte, Moncton Wildcats
QMJHL Humanitarian of the Year - Humanitarian of the Year, David Thibeault, Victoriaville Tigres
Marcel Robert Trophy - Best Scholastic Player, Michel Tremblay, Shawinigan Cataractes
Paul Dumont Trophy - Personality of the Year, Mike Ribeiro, Rouyn-Noranda Huskies

Executive
Ron Lapointe Trophy - Coach of the Year, Guy Chouinard, Quebec Remparts
John Horman Trophy - Executive of the Year, Lionel Brochu, Val-d'Or Foreurs
St-Clair Group Plaque - Marketing Director of the Year, Jeff Rose, Moncton Wildcats

See also
1998 Memorial Cup
1998 NHL Entry Draft
1997–98 OHL season
1997–98 WHL season

References
 Official QMJHL Website
 www.hockeydb.com/

Quebec Major Junior Hockey League seasons
QMJHL